Peter Cox (born 13 January 1954) is an Australian former cricketer. He played ten first-class cricket matches for Victoria between 1978 and 1983.

See also
 List of Victoria first-class cricketers

References

External links
 

1954 births
Living people
Australian cricketers
Victoria cricketers
People from Mildura
Sport in Mildura